Mohan Kalkunte is an electrical engineer with Broadcom Corporation in Irvine, California. He was named a Fellow of the Institute of Electrical and Electronics Engineers (IEEE) in 2015 for his contributions to Ethernet switching architectures and merchant-switching silicon.

References

20th-century births
Living people
Fellow Members of the IEEE
Year of birth missing (living people)
Place of birth missing (living people)
American electrical engineers